The District of Alberta was one of four districts of the Northwest Territories created in 1882. It was styled the Alberta Provisional District to distinguish it from the District of Keewatin which had a more autonomous relationship from the NWT administration. Present-day Province of Alberta takes in the District of Alberta and parts of the Districts of Athabasca, Assiniboia and Saskatchewan. Alberta became a province in 1905.

The boundaries of the district were:
 On the south, the international boundary, 49° north.
 On the east, the line between the 10th and 11th ranges west of the fourth meridian of the Dominion Land Survey. This line, now designated Range Road 110, has jogs at each correction line.
 On the north, the 18th correction line, approximately 55° north, now designated Township Road 710.
 On the west, the British Columbia boundary: the height of land of Pacific Ocean drainage and the 120th meridian west.

See also
Alberta (Provisional District) Former Canadian House of Commons electoral district covering the District of Alberta.
Territorial evolution of Canada
District of Saskatchewan
District of Assiniboia
District of Athabasca

References

 
Districts of the Northwest Territories
History of the Northwest Territories
History of Alberta